The Valley of the Seven Castles is an informal name given to the Äischdall, the valley of the Eisch river, in central Luxembourg.  The valley stretches from the confluence with the Alzette upstream to Steinfort, on the border with Belgium. The entire route can be traversed in about an hour by car, starting near the town of Arlon on the Belgian/Luxembourg border. There is also a 37-kilometre footpath that takes hikers along the valley and past the castles.

It is named after the group of seven castles that line its route.  Those seven castles are (in order, heading upstream):
 Mersch
 Schoenfels
 Hollenfels
 Ansembourg Castle
 New Castle of Ansembourg
 Septfontaines
 Koerich Castle

Landforms of Luxembourg
Capellen (canton)
Mersch (canton)
Valleys of Europe